The Chicago Portage was an ancient portage that connected the Great Lakes waterway system with the Mississippi River system. Connecting these two great water trails meant comparatively easy access from the mouth of the St Lawrence River on the Atlantic Ocean to the Rocky Mountains, and the Gulf of Mexico. The approximately six-mile link had been used by Native Americans for thousands of years during the Pre-Columbian era for travel and trade.

In the summer of 1673 members of the Kaskaskia, a tribe of the Illinois Confederation, led French explorers Louis Jolliet and Father Jacques Marquette, the first known Europeans to explore this part of North America, to the portage.  A strategic location, it became a key to European activity in the Midwest, ultimately leading to the foundation of Chicago.

In 1848, the water divide was breached by the Illinois and Michigan (I&M) Canal cutting through the portage.

Created by a glacier

The history of the Chicago Portage begins at the end of the last Ice Age.  It was formed as the Wisconsin glaciation retreated northward about 10,000 years ago, leaving behind Lake Chicago (now called Lake Michigan), which was created from the glacier's meltwater.

As the glacier melted and retreated, the water in Lake Chicago rose until it overflowed the southwestern edge of the Valparaiso Moraine, which encircles the lake's southern half, creating the Chicago Outlet River. This was a substantial river, comparable to today's Niagara River, and over time it carved the channel later used by the main and south branch of the Chicago River, the Des Plaines River, and the terrain that became the Chicago Portage.

As the glacier continued to retreat, it opened another outlet far to the East that became the St Lawrence River.  This allowed the emerging lakes to drain even faster, and the Chicago Outlet River dried up leaving the gap in the moraine that created the Chicago Portage.

This process created the Chicago Portage, a link between what became known as the Chicago River and what became known as the Des Plaines River. The point at which the portage crossed the low continental divide that separated waters flowing east toward Lake Michigan from waters flowing west toward the Mississippi River was a wetland that occupied the ancient stream bed of the Chicago Outlet River.  Early settlers called this marshy area “Mud Lake”.  The total length of the portage was about six miles.

Mud Lake could be wet, dry, marshy, or frozen, depending on the season and the weather, making it a difficult, albeit very valuable, transportation route.  In very wet weather the water level in both the Des Plaines River and the Chicago River would rise to the point that Mud Lake was flooded, and travelers could traverse the entire six miles by canoe.  Usually, however, particularly in late Summer, it was necessary to pull out canoes at some point and carry them and all supplies around Mud Lake.

A key to travel and trade in North America 
The Chicago Portage allowed easy access, by boat, to almost all of North America, from the mouth of the St Lawrence River to the Rocky Mountains and the Gulf of Mexico.

The St Lawrence River divide 

Until the second half of the nineteenth century water transportation was virtually the only way to move trade goods and people around North America.  Therefore, connections between strategic waterways, usually involving portages, held special importance.

The importance of the Chicago Portage lies in the fact that the channel cut by the Chicago Outlet River created an easy passage over the Saint Lawrence River Divide, the continental divide that separated what had become the Great Lakes waterway system from the Mississippi River waterway system and, as the illustration shows, opened up almost all of what was to become the United States from the Allegheny Mountains to the Rocky Mountains as far south as the Gulf of Mexico.

Early peoples 
Native Americans had used the portage for thousands of years before the arrival of Europeans.  They found the Chicago Portage to be a convenient transportation route between the shores of Lake Michigan and the Mississippi River in the interior.  The map shows that the most important trails in the region led to the portage and the several fords near it.

The map also shows the Old Portage Long trail that was used when there was insufficient water in Mud Lake to allow traverse by canoe.  This trail extended to the southwest to the early settlement of Ottawa on the Illinois River.  Since there was usually sufficient water in the larger Illinois River for canoeing, this “Ottawa Trail” was used in very dry conditions when there was insufficient water in the Des Plaines River.

The first Europeans 

By 1673 the French had established a trading post at present day Mackinac Island at the top of Lake Michigan.  In that year, the first Intendant (administrator) of New France, having heard of reports of a great river to the West and hoping it would be the long-sought "Northwest Passage" to the Pacific Ocean, ordered a reconnaissance mission to find and explore this river.  In May of that year the group, consisting of Louis Jolliet, Father Jacques Marquette, and five voyageurs set out on their voyage of discovery.

The explorers found the Mississippi River, explored it, and then returned to Michilimakinac by a different route on the advice of  Native Americans they had encountered along the way, who told them that there was a better way to return to Lake Michigan.  Travelling by stages up the Illinois River to the Des Plaines River, in September 1673 members of the Caskaskia, a tribe of the Illinois Confederation, led Jolliet and Marquette to the western end of what became known as the Chicago Portage.

During the 18th century, the Chicago Portage was one of the most strategic locations in the interior of the North American continent for the French.  Particularly it provided an easy connection between the French cities of Montreal and New Orleans. An indication of the importance of portages that potentially could make this connection is shown in early maps of the region.  For example, this French map of the western regions of New France, published 1755, shows the “R.(iviere) et Port de Checageu” (River and Port of Checageu), the “Checageu River”, and the “Portage des Chenes” (the portage of oak trees), the name the French originally attached to the Portage.

Crossing the portage 

If water level in the portage was high enough to allow passage by canoe for most of the way, passage across the portage was relatively easy. Accounts from soldiers stationed at Fort Dearborn, at the mouth of the Chicago River, describe a passage from west to east.  Starting at the west end of the portage at the Des Plaines River they paddled east through Portage Creek into the marsh that would later be known as Mud Lake.  At the east end of the marsh they portaged their boats, equipment, and supplies over the low rise of land that was the St Lawrence River continental divide.  They then entered the South Branch of the Chicago River, and paddled north to the Fort.

If water levels in the portage were low, passage was difficult. In 1818 Gurdon Hubbard, then 16 years old and traveling with a “brigade” of voyageurs as an indentured clerk, crossed the Portage from East to West and left an account in his memoirs.

They had traveled down to the Portage from Mackinac Island in bateaux, heavy flat-bottomed boats.  They traveled down the South Branch of the Chicago River and pulled their boats over the St Lawrence Continental Divide into Mud Lake where the water was deep enough to float them.  Then …     

Other members of the crew carried the boats’ cargo, across the seven-mile-long land trail to the Des Plaines River.  Because of his status as clerk of the expedition, by virtue of his ability to read and write, Hubbard was spared this hard work.  He went on to describe the hardships of crossing the Portage in its natural state.

After a hard day of work crossing the portage, the men camped near the river at the west end of the portage.  But their discomfort was not yet over, as Hubbard’s account continues.

Development

Wagon roads and today's highways 
As commerce over the portage grew, local entrepreneurs developed services to help travelers using the Portage.  One such were the wagon roads that made commerce over the Portage much easier during dry periods.  An example is the Ottawa trail that started as a pathway, became a wagon road, and ultimately was paved and became part of US Route 66.

Illinois and Michigan Canal 
The earliest Europeans to cross the Portage saw the potential for a canal dug along the route of the Portage.  Louis Jolliet, after his first passage, opined that a canal across “…only a few leagues of prairie..” could link the Great Lakes with the Mississippi Valley.

Eventually, Joliet’s vision came to reality in the form of the Illinois and Michigan (I&M) Canal which opened in 1848.

The birthplace of Chicago, connecting the East with the West 
Recognizing the strategic importance of the Chicago Portage, in 1803 the new country of the United States built Fort Dearborn at the mouth of the Chicago River to guard it.

In 1848 the opening of the I&M canal allowed water transportation from the mouth of St Lawrence River through Chicago to the Mississippi River and the vast ranch and farm lands drained by it.  The population of the City tripled in the next six years.  The Chicago Portage, established thousands of years before as the link between the two great waterway systems of America, would give birth to Chicago which would go on to become the transportation hub of the US and continue its role as the link between the East and the West.

The official flag of the City of Chicago is a stylized map of the Chicago Portage, with four red stars symbolizing the city, separating two blue stripes symbolizing the two great waters that meet at the city.

Chicago portage national historic site

The Chicago Portage National Historic Site is a National Historic Site in Lyons, Cook County, Illinois, United States. Preserved within the park is the western end of the historic portage linking the Chicago River to the Des Plaines River, thereby linking the Great Lakes to the Mississippi River. The site is the only part of the historic Chicago Portage that remains in a natural and protected state more or less as it existed when revealed to French explorers Louis Jolliet  and Father Jacques Marquette by Native Americans.

The site, designated January 3, 1952 as an "affiliated area" of the National Park Service, is owned and administered by the Forest Preserve District of Cook County

The Des Plaines River today is not the river as it was in 1673 when Jolliet and Marquette first encountered the Chicago Portage. During the period 1892-1900 the original channel of the river was straightened, cutting off the part that the Jolliet and Marquette party used to reach the west end of the portage, but a visitor to the site today can still see the remnants of the old course of the river.

Gallery

See also 
Chicago River
Geography of Chicago
Valparaiso Moraine
Lake Chicago
Saint Lawrence River Divide
Laurentian Divide
Eastern Continental Divide
Stevenson Expressway
Illinois and Michigan Canal
Chicago Sanitary and Ship Canal

References

External links
 Chicago Portage official site
 National Park Service
 Stateparks.com
Chicago Portage Ledger: Carnegie Mellon University Libraries
Jolliet and La Salle's Canal Plans at Encyclopedia of Chicago
The Continental Divide in Oak Park
Chicago Portage History

Geography of Chicago
Great Lakes
History of Chicago
Illinois waterways
Mississippi River watershed
Portages in the United States
Transportation in Chicago
Water gaps of the United States
Valleys of Illinois